Vreni Leiser (born 23 September 1945) is a Swiss sprinter. She competed in the women's 400 metres at the 1972 Summer Olympics.

References

1945 births
Living people
Athletes (track and field) at the 1972 Summer Olympics
Swiss female sprinters
Olympic athletes of Switzerland
Place of birth missing (living people)
Olympic female sprinters